Emma Tattam is a female former swimmer who competed for England.

Swimming career
Tattam was the British champion over 100 metres backstroke in 1994. She represented England in the backstroke events, at the 1994 Commonwealth Games in Victoria, British Columbia, Canada.

She swan for the Portsmouth Northsea Swimming Club.

References

English female swimmers
Swimmers at the 1994 Commonwealth Games
Commonwealth Games competitors for England
1973 births
Living people